The K3 League was a South Korean amateur football league held annually from 2007 to 2019. It was considered the third-highest division of the South Korean football league system before the K League 2 was launched in 2013, and the fourth-highest division since then. In 2017, it was divided into K3 League Advanced and fifth-tier league K3 League Basic, and introduced a system of promotion and relegation. In 2020, it was reborn as a semi-professional league after merging with the Korea National League.

History
The K3 League had an exhibition season held in two stages with ten teams in 2007. The winners of both stages and the best two clubs in the overall standings qualified for the championship playoffs and the 2008 Korean FA Cup. Seoul United became inaugural champions after winning the championship playoffs.

After the league was officially launched in 2008, the number of participating clubs was increased to 18 until the 2010 season, while new clubs registered in the league or some of the existing clubs were dissolved due to financial problems. Seoul Pabal, which engaged in match-fixing scandal during the 2008 season, was also dissolved at that time.

It was renamed the Challengers League in 2011 and the K3 Challengers League in 2014, but used original name again since 2015 after being criticised for being confused with a youth league of K League clubs (which had the same name) and the K League Challenge.

In 2017, it introduced a system of promotion and relegation, and was divided into the first division K3 League Advanced and the second division the K3 League Basic.

After the 2019 season, amateur level K3 League was revamped as a semi-professional league with the same name. The Korea National League and the K3 League Advanced were absorbed into the third division and were rebranded as the new K3 League.

Competition format

Regular season
2007–2008: After the regular season was operated in two stages, the winners of both stages and the best two clubs in the overall standings qualified for the championship playoffs.
2009: All clubs played home and away season, and the championship playoffs were not held.
2010–2012: The participating clubs were divided into two groups, and the winners and runners-up of both groups qualified for the championship playoffs. All clubs had interleague play once after playing home and away season in each group.
2013–2015: The third-placed clubs of both groups also qualified for the championship playoffs.
2016–2019: All clubs played in a single league without groups, and the top five clubs qualified for the championship playoffs.

Championship playoffs
2007–2011: All four clubs entered in the semi-finals.
2012: On the basis of the overall standings, third and fourth-placed club entered the first round, and first-placed club directly advanced to the final (third round).
2013–2015: On the basis of the overall standings, first and second-placed club directly advanced to the final and semi-final respectively, and the other four clubs entered the first round.
2016–2019: The winners of the regular season directly advanced to the final, and the other four clubs entered the first round.

All-time clubs
Jeonju Citizen (2007–2019)
Seoul Nowon United (2007–2019)
Yangju Citizen (2007–2019)
Cheonan FC (2007–2015)
Asan United (2007–2013)
Goyang Citizen (2008–2019)
Gyeongju Citizen (2008–2019)
Pocheon Citizen (2008–2019)
Pyeongchang FC (2008–2019)
Icheon Citizen (2009–2019)
Cheongju FC (2009–2019)
Seoul FC Martyrs (2009–2015)
Chuncheon FC (2010–2019)
Yeonggwang FC (2010–2016)
Paju Citizen (2012–2019)
Seoul Jungnang (2012–2019)
Gimpo Citizen FC (2013–2019)
Hwaseong FC (2013–2019) Samcheok Shinwoo Electronics (2007–2010)
Yongin Citizen (2007–2010)
Changwon United (2007–2008)
Seoul Pabal (2007–2008)
Daegu Korea Powertrain (2007)
Bucheon FC 1995 (2008–2012)
Namyangju United (2008–2012)
Jeonju Ongoeul (2008–2009)
FC Uijeongbu (2014–2018)
Siheung City (2016–2019)
Yangpyeong FC (2016–2019)
Buyeo FC (2016–2018)
Cheongju City (2016–2018)
Chungju Citizen (2017–2019)
Pyeongtaek Citizen (2017–2019)
Yeoju Citizen (2017–2019)
Busan FC (2017–2018)
Ulsan Citizen (2018–2019)

Champions

List of champions

Titles by club

List of champions (Basic)

See also
 K3 League
 K4 League
 Challengers Cup
 South Korean football league system

References

External links
 Official website 

 
4
2007 establishments in South Korea
Sports leagues established in 2007
Fourth level football leagues in Asia